Paul Isaac Bernays (17 October 1888 – 18 September 1977) was a Swiss mathematician who made significant contributions to mathematical logic, axiomatic set theory, and the philosophy of mathematics. He was an assistant and close collaborator of David Hilbert.

Biography
Bernays was born into a distinguished German-Jewish family of scholars and businessmen. His great-grandfather, Isaac ben Jacob Bernays, served as chief rabbi of Hamburg from 1821 to 1849.

Bernays spent his childhood in Berlin, and attended the Köllner Gymnasium, 1895–1907. At the University of Berlin, he studied mathematics under Issai Schur, Edmund Landau, Ferdinand Georg Frobenius, and Friedrich Schottky; philosophy under Alois Riehl, Carl Stumpf and Ernst Cassirer; and physics under Max Planck. At the University of Göttingen, he studied mathematics under David Hilbert, Edmund Landau, Hermann Weyl, and Felix Klein; physics under Voigt and Max Born; and philosophy under Leonard Nelson.

In 1912, the University of Berlin awarded him a Ph.D. in mathematics for a thesis, supervised by Landau, on the analytic number theory of binary quadratic forms. That same year, the University of Zurich awarded him habilitation for a thesis on complex analysis and Picard's theorem. The examiner was Ernst Zermelo. Bernays was Privatdozent at the University of Zurich, 1912–17, where he came to know George Pólya. His collected communications with Kurt Gödel span many decades.

Starting in 1917, David Hilbert employed Bernays to assist him with his investigations of the foundation of arithmetic. Bernays also lectured on other areas of mathematics at the University of Göttingen. In 1918, that university awarded him a second habilitation for a thesis on the axiomatics of the propositional calculus of Principia Mathematica.

In 1922, Göttingen appointed Bernays extraordinary professor without tenure. His most successful student there was Gerhard Gentzen. After Nazi Germany enacted the Law for the Restoration of the Professional Civil Service in 1933, the university fired Bernays because of his Jewish ancestry. 

After working privately for Hilbert for six months, Bernays and his family moved to Switzerland, whose nationality he had inherited from his father, and where the ETH Zurich employed him on occasion. He also visited the University of Pennsylvania and was a visiting scholar at the Institute for Advanced Study in 1935–36 and again in 1959–60.

Mathematical work

Bernays's collaboration with Hilbert culminated in the two volume work, Grundlagen der Mathematik (English: Foundations of Mathematics) published in 1934 and 1939, which is discussed in Sieg and Ravaglia (2005). A proof in this work that a sufficiently strong consistent theory cannot contain its own reference functor is known as the Hilbert–Bernays paradox.

In seven papers, published between 1937 and 1954 in the Journal of Symbolic Logic (republished in Müller 1976), Bernays set out an axiomatic set theory whose starting point was a related theory John von Neumann had set out in the 1920s. Von Neumann's theory took the notions of function and argument as primitive. Bernays recast von Neumann's theory so that classes and sets were primitive. Bernays's theory, with modifications by Kurt Gödel, is known as von Neumann–Bernays–Gödel set theory.

Publications

Notes

References
 .
Kneebone, Geoffrey, 1963. Mathematical Logic and the Foundation of Mathematics. Van Nostrand. Dover reprint, 2001. A gentle introduction to some of the ideas in the Grundlagen der Mathematik.

External links

Hilbert Bernays Project

Paul Bernays: A Short Biography (1976)

1888 births
1977 deaths
20th-century Swiss philosophers
Institute for Advanced Study visiting scholars
Jewish philosophers
Jewish scientists
Mathematical logicians
Philosophers of mathematics
Set theorists
Swiss Ashkenazi Jews
Swiss mathematicians
Swiss philosophers
Academic staff of ETH Zurich